Mystique may refer to:
 Mystique (personality trait), a personality trait similar to charisma
 Mystique (character), a Marvel Comics character associated with the X-Men
 Mystique (casino), a casino/greyhound race track in Dubuque, Iowa, USA
 Mystique (company), producer of a number of pornographic video games for the Atari 2600 including Custer's Revenge
 Mystique (Blackpool Pleasure Beach), a former illusion show at Blackpool Pleasure Beach, Lancashire, England
 Mystique Summers Madison, American drag queen
 Matrox Mystique, 2D, 3D and video acceleration card produced by Matrox in 1996/97
 Mercury Mystique, a compact car produced by the Ford Motor Company from 1995 to 2000
 Mis-Teeq, an English R&B group
 Music City Mystique, a Percussion Independent World (PIW) Drumline from Nashville, Tennessee

See also
Mystic (disambiguation)
Mustique